Q89 may refer to:
 Q89 (New York City bus)
 Al-Fajr (surah), of the Quran